Alexander Abaza (1934–2011) was a Soviet photographer. His photographs were exhibited at the Multimedia Art Museum, Moscow in 2005.

References

1934 births
2011 deaths
Soviet photographers